Wade Fenton (born 31 July 1971), is an Australian former professional rugby league footballer who played in the 1990s and 2000s. He played for the Melbourne Storm in 1998 and 2000.

A rugged  forward Fenton played 114 games in the Queensland Cup with Norths Devils, and had decided to retire at the end of the 2002 Queensland Cup season after battling injury, but made a comeback during the 2003 season.

During his playing career Fenton dabbled in player management, at one point managing teammate Steven Bell through contract negotiations.

References

External links
Statistics at rugbyleagueproject.org

1971 births
Living people
Australian rugby league players
Melbourne Storm players
Norths Devils players
Place of birth missing (living people)